Sweet Taste of Souls is a 2020 American fantasy horror film directed by Terry Ross and written by F. Scott Mudgett. The film stars Honey Lauren, John Salandria, Mark Valeriano and Amber Gaston.

Plot
When band members stop at a roadside cafe for a slice of pie, they find themselves locked up in the unstable cafe owners surreal art collection and must battle a menacing force with a taste for souls.

Cast
Honey Lauren as Ellinore
John Salandria as Nate
Mark Valeriano as Kyle
Amber Gaston as Wendy
Sarah J. Bartholomew as Lily
Thom Michael Mulligan as Barney
Frank Papia as Sid
Jesse LeNoir as Tucker
Darn Oldham as Raymond
Scott Alin as Patrick

Production

The film was produced by Flying Dolphin Productions. Principal photography took place in Julian, California as well as San Diego County over twenty six days.

Release

The film screened at Cosmo Film Festival. It was released on November 1, 2020 and distributed by TriCoast Worldwide.

Reception
Paul Chapinal at Film-news.co.uk scored it 3 out of 5, claiming it has "enough twists and turns to keep the attention." The Scariest Things scored it 3 out of 5, concluding it is "Delicious cherry pie." Horror Bound called it "a new unique tale in horror." In a review at PopHorror, Anthony Baamonde claims the "acting is fabulous, and Honey Lauren totally steals the show." In a less favorable review, Explosion Network scored it 4 out of 10 claiming that the "core concept is unique enough to carry the weaker parts of the film." Without Your Head scored the film 2 out of 5 stating the film had "great concepts that never get the execution they deserve." Film critic Jennie Kermode at Eye for Film scored in 1 out of 5, stating "you'll be left feeling as if you've been watching this picture for years."

References

External links
 
 
 

2020s English-language films
2020 horror thriller films
2020 fantasy films
Films set in restaurants
Films set in San Diego
Films shot in San Diego
American horror films
American fantasy films
Films directed by Terry Ross
Films about music and musicians
2020s American films
Films about kidnapping in the United States
Films about hostage takings
Magic realism films
Films about size change